The Shooting Stars Awards are presented annually by the pan-European network organization European Film Promotion (EFP) to emerging actors from Europe. "Shooting Stars" is an initiative of the EFP for the international promotion and networking of promising up-and-coming actors from the 37 EFP member countries. Since 1998, ten talents selected from all over Europe have been presented each year during the Berlin International Film Festival (Berlinale) to the international press, the general public, and the film industry. The four-day programme culminates with the presentation of the European Shooting Stars Awards.

Selection and Programme
The EFP member organisations from a total of 37 European countries can each nominate one actor/actress aged between 18 and 32, who has been successful and already won awards in their native country.

An independent international expert jury selects the 10 best and internationally most promising talents to then be presented at the Berlinale to international casting directors, agencies, directors, producers as well as the international press and the general public and to also receive the European Shooting Star Award at the end of the programme.

Award winners
Up until 2018, a total of 170 actresses and 133 actors had been presented at the Berlinale and received awards as European Shooting Stars, including the now internationally known actors Rachel Weisz (UK 1998), Franka Potente (Germany 1998), Daniel Craig (UK 2000), August Diehl (Germany 2000), Nina Hoss (Germany 2000), Thure Lindhardt (Denmark 2000), Heike Makatsch (Germany 2001), Ludivine Sagnier (France 2001), Jérémie Renier (Belgium 2002), Daniel Brühl (Germany 2003), Nikolaj Lie Kaas (Denmark 2003), Matthias Schoenaerts (Belgium 2003), Andrew Scott (Ireland 2004), Ruth Negga (Ireland 2006), Mélanie Laurent (France 2007), Andrew Garfield  (UK 2008), Carey Mulligan (UK 2009), Pilou Asbaek (Denmark 2011), Alicia Vikander (Sweden 2011), Riz Ahmed (UK 2012), Carla Juri (Switzerland 2013), George MacKay (UK 2014) and Maisie Williams (UK 2015).

1990s

2000s

2010s

Partners 
The European Shooting Stars is supported by the participating EFP member organisations, the Creative Europe MEDIA Programme of the European Union as well as by other cooperation partners and sponsors.

References

External links
 

European film awards